Serghei Cretu (born 4 December 1971) is a Moldovan weightlifter. He competed in the men's lightweight event at the 1996 Summer Olympics.

References

1971 births
Living people
Moldovan male weightlifters
Olympic weightlifters of Moldova
Weightlifters at the 1996 Summer Olympics
Place of birth missing (living people)